Yvo Gaukes (Latin: Yvonis; also Yves, Ivo) (c. 1660–1738) was a prominent physician who practised at Emden and can be counted among the iatromathematicians of his time. In his best-known theoretical publication, Dissertatio de medicina ad certitudinem mathematicam evehenda (1712) he developed a medical theory on the grounds of Cartesianism, proposing sizes and shapes for the main components of the Four Humors based on these largely philosophical considerations. Gaukes also popularized Species Lignorum, a variant of the numerous Guaiacum wood extracts that had been used to treat syphilis since the late 16th century.

Most of Gaukes' works in clinical medicine, which were largely published in Groningen and Amsterdam, are limited to case reports.

Works by Yvo Gaukes
 (1695)
Yvonis Gaukes (1700). 
 (1700)
 (1712)

References
Brockhaus Allg. Enzyklopädie der Wissenschaften und Künste. 55. Theil. Gaukes-Gefreiter. p. 1. Leipzig 1852

People from Emden